Folkocracy is an upcoming album by Rufus Wainwright, slated for release by BMG on June 2, 2023.

Composition 
Folkocracy was produced by Mitchell Froom. Guests on the album include ANOHNI, Andrew Bird, David Byrne, Brandi Carlile Sheryl Crow, Madison Cunningham, Susanna Hoffs, Chaka Khan, John Legend, Anna McGarrigle, Van Dyke Parks, Nicole Scherzinger, Chris Stills, and Chaim Tannenbaum.

Promotion 
"Down in the Willow" served as the lead single.

Track listing
Alone (feat. Madison Cunningham)
Heading for Home (feat. John Legend)
Twelve-Thirty (Young Girls Are Coming to the Canyon) (feat. Susanna Hoffs, Chris Stills, Sheryl Crow)
Down in the Willow Garden (feat. Brandi Carlile)
Shenandoah
Nacht und Träume
Harvest (feat. Andrew Bird, Chris Stills)
Going to a Town (feat. ANOHNI)
High on a Rocky Ledge (feat. David Byrne)
Kaulana Nā Pua (feat. Nicole Scherzinger)
Hush Little Baby (feat. Martha Wainwright, Lucy Wainwright Roche)
Black Gold (feat. Van Dyke Parks)
Cotton Eyed Joe (feat. Chaka Khan)
Arthur McBride
Wild Mountain Thyme (feat. Anna McGarrigle, Chaim Tannenbaum, Lily Lanken, Lucy Wainwright Roche, Martha Wainwright)

Track listing adapted from RufusWainwright.com

References

External links
 

2023 albums
Rufus Wainwright albums
Upcoming albums